Lee Jae-sung is a South Korean international football winger for Mainz 05

Lee Jae-sung may also refer to:
Lee Jae-sung (boxer) (born 1983), South Korean boxer
Lee Jae-sung (footballer, born 1985), South Korean football defender
Lee Jae-sung (footballer, born 1988), South Korea international football defender for Chungnam Asan FC